Directo a México is a program launched in 2005 and operated by the Federal Reserve and Banco de Mexico, the central banks of the United States and Mexico, respectively. The program allows commercial banks and credit unions in the U.S. to transfer money through FedACH, the Federal Reserve's clearinghouse, which is linked to Banco de Mexico.

External links
Directo a Mexico Official Website
Wall Street Journal article about Directo a Mexico
Article from the Havana Journal about Directo a Mexico

Mexico–United States relations
Federal Reserve System